Kathleen Murray "Katie" O'Sullivan (born August 21, 1969) is a Washington attorney in private practice. In 2018, she was announced as a nominee to become a United States district judge of the United States District Court for the Western District of Washington but she was never officially nominated for the position.

Biography 

O'Sullivan was born on August 21, 1969, in New York City. O'Sullivan received a Bachelor of Arts degree, cum laude, from Yale University in 1991 and her Juris Doctor, cum laude, from Georgetown University Law Center in 1996.

She served as a law clerk to Judge Harold H. Greene of the United States District Court for the District of Columbia from 1996 to 1997 and to Judge M. Margaret McKeown of the United States Court of Appeals for the Ninth Circuit from 1998 to 1999.

O'Sullivan is a partner at the Seattle law firm of Perkins Coie, where she specializes in appellate and commercial litigation. She has spent the entirety of her legal career at Perkins Coie, with the exception of the two years she spent clerking.  She joined the law firm as an associate in 1997 and was elevated to partner in 2004. She serves on the Council of the American Law Institute.

Failed nomination to district court under Obama 

On April 14, 2016, President Obama nominated O'Sullivan to serve as a United States District Judge of the United States District Court for the Western District of Washington, to the seat vacated by Judge Marsha J. Pechman, who took senior status on February 6, 2016. That nomination expired on January 3, 2017, with the end of the 114th Congress.

Renomination to district court under Trump 

On July 13, 2018, President Trump announced his intention to re-nominate O'Sullivan to serve as a United States District Judge of the United States District Court for the Western District of Washington. President Trump was to nominate O'Sullivan to the same seat. However, due to a dispute over the nomination of Eric D. Miller, O'Sullivan's nomination was never submitted to the Senate.

References 

1969 births
Living people
20th-century American lawyers
21st-century American lawyers

Georgetown University Law Center alumni
Lawyers from New York City
Lawyers from Seattle
Washington (state) lawyers
Yale College alumni
Members of the American Law Institute
American women legal scholars
American legal scholars
20th-century American women lawyers
21st-century American women lawyers
People associated with Perkins Coie